Clan Matheson was the name of five steamships operated by Clan Line.

, sold in 1905 and sunk in 1906.
, captured and sunk in 1914
, sunk in a collision in 1918
, sold in 1948.
, scrapped in 1978.

Ship names